Fayetteville is an unincorporated community in Johnson County, in the U.S. state of Missouri.

History
Fayetteville was founded in the mid-1840s, and named after Lafayette Collins, a local storekeeper. A post office called Fayetteville was established in 1856, and remained in operation until 1919.

References

Unincorporated communities in Johnson County, Missouri
Unincorporated communities in Missouri